David Adamany Undergraduate Library (UGL) is one of Wayne State University’s largest libraries built in 1997 named after the university's 8th president, David Adamany.

Introduction 
The David Adamany Undergraduate Library alone provides 2,337 seats, 27 group study rooms, and 3 instruction labs. It has over 500 computer workstations providing students with access to electronic resources. The learning needs of 1000 and 2000 level undergraduate courses are intended to be supported with the wide variety of books and magazines. The library also contains the DeRoy Extended Study Center providing 24-hour access to 140 standard workstations as well as 30 high-end work stations with specialized software. Also, approximately 8000 videos, DVDs, laser discs and audiotapes are in the media collection. The Undergraduate Library also provides students with information on careers, computers, and student survival skills.

In the Association of Research Libraries, Wayne State University libraries rank among the top 60 libraries.

Location 
David Adamany Undergraduate Library is located at 5150 Anthony Wayne in Detroit, Michigan. Within the Wayne State University campus, it is situated at the center of Gullen Mall.

Within Detroit, UGL is located within a couple miles from the three major freeways that run through the city; I-75, I-94 and the Lodge (M-10).

History 
David Adamany faced a lot of adversity when he first came up with the idea of an undergraduate library in 1982. Adamany looked at the libraries that existed at Wayne State. Not only did he see a need for additional space and further collection development, he saw an opportunity. A library just for undergrads was a new concept. Adamany and library administration persevered through the years and worked to make the undergraduate library a reality. Over ten years after the idea was introduced in May 1986, ground was broken on February 2, 1996, in front of a substantial crowd in sub-zero degree temperatures. From there, things moved quickly. Construction took less than two years and staff worked hard to prepare for the September 1997 opening of the UGL with an interior size of 300.000 square feet

Art at Adamany 
The Wayne State University Art Collection, which has grown to include nearly 6000 works of art, has proved a primary resource for creating such an environment. There are decorations and paintings on the walls within the UGL which embrace and enhance the everyday lives of people. The art at Adamany reinforces Wayne State University’s and Detroit's standing as a center for artistic expression.

Within the UGL

First floor 

 Information Desk
 Advising Office
Advising office counsels students academically on how to succeed in their classes as well as aid them in their career development. Students can also learn more about study abroad programs and the office is responsible for providing reasonable accommodations for those persons with disabilities on campus. Professional learning specialists are available to aid students in academic success. Four types of tutoring are available at the Academic Success Center: (1) Students may apply to meet one hour weekly with a student expert, to assist them with work in a particular course; (2) Drop-in tutoring is available at the Center in specific courses; (3) On-line tutoring is available in specific courses, (4) Supplemental Instruction (SI) is available in many first-year introductory courses, in which SI leaders collaborate with the course instructor. These student experts attend each lecture, organize and facilitate group study sessions following the lecture (one to three hours per week), and direct students toward academic success.
 Helen L. DeRoy Extended Hours Study Center
The center provides 24-hour study area with computer workstations, printers, scanners, study tables, and help desk support. The computer support center is also located within this section of the library. Staff at the center help students who are experiencing problems with their Wayne State email address, blackboard program, pipeline, computer applications, and other technologies.
 Bernath Auditorium
 Online Catalog
 Staff Lounge
 Student Lounge
 Media Equipment Desk
 Book Check-Out Desk
 Delilah's Cafe

Second floor 

 Collaborative Study Rooms
Located in the study room are large white boards as well as glass windows where students can physically write upon them with dry erase markers, which are provided at the front desk of the UGL. Computer workstations and printers are also provided, but outside the study rooms.
 Books, Magazines, and VHS
Roving librarians are out and about on the second floor of the UGL to help you find articles, answer reference questions and assist in other research needs.
 Student Technology Studio
The center helps provides technology equipment and software for individual or small groups of students to use in creating multimedia projects, assignments or other course related activities.
 Writing Center
The writing center serves as a supportive resource for students who want to become better writers. Peer tutors work with students writing in all disciplines. Whether students are trying to understand an assignment or working on a first or final draft of a project, the writing center is the place for students to share ideas about writing.
 Honors College
The Irvin D. Reid Honors College is the major department within the UGL. It exemplifies Wayne State University’s commitment to the urban experience and to the enhancement of teaching, service and research. It is the mission of Honors to promote informed, engaged citizenship as the foundation for academic fineness in a diverse global setting. Honors is a home to more than 1,300 students who may choose their major from among the 126 bachelor's degrees offered by the university. Honors is established on four pillars: Community, Service, Research and Career.

Third floor 
 Office of the Dean
 Collaborative Study Rooms
Located in the study room are large white boards as well as glass windows where students can physically write upon them with dry erase markers, which are provided at the front desk of the UGL. Computer workstations and printers are also provided, but outside the study rooms.

Notes

References

 WSU Library System
 10 Years of UGL
 Wayne State Academic Center
 UGL at WSU
 Wayne State Honors College Brochures
 Art at Adamany

Wayne State University
1997 establishments in Michigan
Libraries in Detroit